Li Xin (born 5 November 1969 in Benxi, Liaoning) is a Chinese women's basketball coach and former international player. She won a silver medal with the Chinese women's national basketball team at the 1992 Barcelona Olympics.

In 1998, the newly promoted Beijing Olympians hired Li as their head coach for their debut season in the Chinese Basketball Association. She thus became the first ever female head coach in the CBA, but she was fired after only five games and replaced by Mike McGee, a former player of the Los Angeles Lakers, who then became the first ever foreign head coach in the CBA. The Olympians finished fourth and lost in the semi-finals to the Bayi Rockets in the 1998–99 season.

References 

1969 births
Living people
Chinese women's basketball players
Basketball players from Liaoning
People from Benxi
Basketball players at the 1992 Summer Olympics
Basketball players at the 1996 Summer Olympics
Medalists at the 1992 Summer Olympics
Olympic basketball players of China
Olympic medalists in basketball
Olympic silver medalists for China
Basketball players at the 1990 Asian Games
Basketball players at the 1994 Asian Games
Asian Games medalists in basketball
Asian Games silver medalists for China
Asian Games bronze medalists for China

Medalists at the 1990 Asian Games
Medalists at the 1994 Asian Games
Chinese women's basketball coaches